Èric Jover Comas (born November 1977) is an Andorran politician and member of the Democrats for Andorra (DA) political party. Jover has served as the Minister of Finance of Andorra since 22 May 2019. He previously served as Minister of Education.

On 12 October 2020, Jover announced that he had tested positive for COVID-19, becoming the country's highest profile official to become infected during the COVID-19 pandemic in Andorra so far. Several members of the Andorran government self quarantined in response to Jover's diagnosis, including Cèsar Marquina, Marc Ballestà, Guillem Casal, Mònica Bonell Tuset, and Lara Vilamala.

References

1977 births
Finance Ministers of Andorra
Government ministers of Andorra
Members of the General Council (Andorra)
Democrats for Andorra politicians
University of Barcelona alumni
Living people